The 1920 VPI Gobblers football team represented Virginia Polytechnic Institute in the 1920 college football season. The team was led by their head coach Stanley Sutton and finished with a record of four wins and six losses (4–6).

The week before their first game of the season, VPI's captain and star fullback Henry Redd broke his arm.

Schedule

Game summaries

William & Mary

The starting lineup for VPI was: Parrish (left end), Tilson (left tackle), Resh (left guard), Hardwick (center), Saunders (right guard), Effinger (right tackle), Washington (right end), Lybrook (quarterback), Martin (left halfback), Sutton (right halfback), Shaner (fullback).The substitutes were: Carpenter, Eldridge, Hutchinson, Jones, Moore, Newman, Rice, Shaeffer, Sheppard, Sherertz and Wallace.

Emory and Henry
The starting lineup for VPI was: Parrish (left end), Effinger (left tackle), Tilson (left guard), Hardwick (center), Saunders (right guard), Crisp (right tackle), Wilson (right end), Lybrook (quarterback), Martin (left halfback), Sutton (right halfback), Wallace (fullback).The substitutes were: Givens, Newman, Shaeffer, Shaner and Sherertz.

Rutgers

The starting lineup for VPI was: Parrish (left end), Tilson (left tackle), Resh (left guard), Hardwick (center), Effinger (right guard), Crisp (right tackle), Washington (right end), Lybrook (quarterback), Martin (left halfback), Sutton (right halfback), Wallace (fullback).The substitutes were: Jones, Moore, Rice, Shaeffer, Sheppard, Sherertz and Wilson.

Maryland

The starting lineup for VPI was: Parrish (left end), T. Tilson (left tackle), Effinger (left guard), Hardwick (center), Sherertz (right guard), Crisp (right tackle), Carpenter (right end), Lybrook (quarterback), Sutton (left halfback), Shaeffer (right halfback), W. Tilson (fullback).The substitutes were: Eldridge, Jones, Moore, Rice, Washington and Wilson.

Washington and Lee

The starting lineup for VPI was: Parrish (left end), T. Tilson (left tackle), Resh (left guard), Hardwick (center), Sherertz (right guard), Crisp (right tackle), Carpenter (right end), Lybrook (quarterback), Sutton (left halfback), Shaeffer (right halfback), Martin (fullback).The substitutes were: Rutherford, Saunders, Wallace, Washington and Wilson.

Richmond

The starting lineup for VPI was: Parrish (left end), T. Tilson (left tackle), Resh (left guard), Hardwick (center), Sherertz (right guard), Crisp (right tackle), Carpenter (right end), Lybrook (quarterback), Sutton (left halfback), Wallace (right halfback), Martin (fullback).The substitutes were: Jones, Saunders, Shaeffer and Wilson.

NC State

The starting lineup for VPI was: Parrish (left end), Tilson (left tackle), Resh (left guard), Hardwick (center), Sherertz (right guard), Crisp (right tackle), Carpenter (right end), Lybrook (quarterback), Sutton (left halfback), Wallace (right halfback), Martin (fullback).The substitutes were: Saunders, Shaeffer, Sheppard and W. Wilson.

Centre

The starting lineup for VPI was: Parrish (left end), Tilson (left tackle), Resh (left guard), Hardwick (center), Sherertz (right guard), Crisp (right tackle), Carpenter (right end), Lybrook (quarterback), Sutton (left halfback), Wallace (right halfback), Martin (fullback).The substitutes were: Jones, Shaeffer and Tilson.

VMI

The starting lineup for VPI was: Parrish (left end), T. Tilson (left tackle), Resh (left guard), Hardwick (center), Saunders (right guard), Crisp (right tackle), Carpenter (right end), Wallace (quarterback), Sutton (left halfback), Shaeffer (right halfback), Sherertz (fullback).The substitutes were: Flory, Jones and Lybrook.

Players
The following players were members of the 1920 football team according to the roster published in the 1921 edition of The Bugle, the Virginia Tech yearbook.

References

VPI
Virginia Tech Hokies football seasons
VPI Gobblers football